Hamatastus fasciatus is a species of longhorn beetle in the family Cerambycidae. It was described by Glimour in 1957.

References

Acanthocinini
Beetles described in 1957